"Open Door" is a song by American rock band Attaloss, released April 10, 2012 as the first single from the group's first album, Attaloss (2012).

Music video

The video of "Open Door" was directed by Brian Henderson which was filmed at Big Bear Mountain, CA.

Track listing

References

External links
Official Attaloss website
Official Open Door music video

2012 singles
2011 songs